Angus Gillean Mathew Maclaine, Younger of Lochbuie is the 27th hereditary Chief of Clan Maclaine of Lochbuie. He is the founder and chief executive officer of Fundamental Media, an international media planning and research company. Angus was born 25 January 1975 in Durban, South Africa, and was educated at Kearsney College and the University of Natal (Howard College) and is the son of Lorne Maclaine and Sandra Faulds.

Following his studies, Angus pursued a career in London where he was employed by the Pearson Group as an Advertising Executive responsible for a suite of Financial Times magazines. In 2004 he resigned from the Financial Times, and founded Fundamental Media. By 2016, Fundamental Media had expanded from a single office into an integrated international media service agency with offices in London, Boston, Hong Kong and Sydney.

On 29 September 2018, Angus married Nina Maclaine (nee Boshoff) at Botleys Mansion in Ottershaw, Surrey. Nina is daughter of Luna and the late Tobie Boshoff. Angus has three children, Cameron, Gregor, Natalie with the late Susan Maclaine (nee Moffat) and two children, Arabella and Hamish with Nina. Angus, Nina and all the children currently reside in Hampshire.

References

Angus
University of Natal alumni
1975 births
People from Durban
Living people
Alumni of Kearsney College